Johnson Lake Airport  is located near Johnson Lake, Alberta, Canada.

References

Registered aerodromes in Alberta
Transport in the Regional Municipality of Wood Buffalo